Wang Manli (Wáng Mànlì, born 17 March 1973) is a Chinese ice speed skater who won a silver medal in the Women's 500 m at the 2006 Winter Olympics.

External links
 Profile on SkateResults
 

1973 births
Living people
Olympic silver medalists for China
Olympic speed skaters of China
People from Mudanjiang
Speed skaters at the 1998 Winter Olympics
Speed skaters at the 2002 Winter Olympics
Speed skaters at the 2006 Winter Olympics
Olympic medalists in speed skating
Chinese female speed skaters
Sportspeople from Heilongjiang
Medalists at the 2006 Winter Olympics
Asian Games medalists in speed skating
Speed skaters at the 1996 Asian Winter Games
Speed skaters at the 1999 Asian Winter Games
Speed skaters at the 2003 Asian Winter Games
Asian Games gold medalists for China
Asian Games silver medalists for China
Asian Games bronze medalists for China
Medalists at the 1996 Asian Winter Games
Medalists at the 1999 Asian Winter Games
Medalists at the 2003 Asian Winter Games
20th-century Chinese women
21st-century Chinese women